William Owen (ca. 1540 – by 1580) was an English politician.

He was a Member (MP) of the Parliament of England for Oxford in 1572.

References

1540s births
1580 deaths
English MPs 1572–1583